The First Time is the debut studio album by American country pop singer Kelsea Ballerini. It was released on May 19, 2015, by Black River Entertainment. The album's track listing and cover art was released on April 1, 2015. With the album's first three singles all reaching number one on the Billboard Country Airplay chart, Ballerini became the first new female artist to send her first three releases to the top of the charts.

Singles 
"Love Me Like You Mean It", the album's lead single, was released to digital retailers on July 8, 2014 and to country radio on September 22, 2014. The single received good reviews from critics, who praised its pop-country blend production, but criticized its flirty lyrics. The song reached a peak of number five on the US Billboard Hot Country Songs chart and number one on the Country Airplay chart. It is the first song by a solo female to top the country music charts since "Blown Away" in 2012, and makes Ballerini the first female artist to take her debut single to the top spot since Carrie Underwood's first officially-promoted country music single, "Jesus, Take the Wheel", in 2006. The official music video premiered in March 2015, and has over one million views. "Peter Pan" was released as a promotional single on May 5, 2015.

"Dibs" was released on July 20, 2015 as the album's second single. It became her second number one hit in March 2016, making her the first solo female country music artist to start her career with back-to-back number one hits since Jamie O'Neal in 2001 with "There Is No Arizona" and "When I Think About Angels".

"Peter Pan" was released as the album's third single in March 2016. She performed the song on the Academy of Country Music Awards with Nick Jonas. The song topped the Billboard Country Airplay and Hot Country Songs charts the same week, making Ballerini the first female artist to accomplish this feat.

"Yeah Boy" was announced as the album's fourth and final single on August 26, 2016. It impacted country radio on October 10, 2016.

Reception 

The First Time was compared to the early works of Taylor Swift in a review by the British publication, Evening Standard, who also described the album as "country with a small c" and stated that due to its "strong melodies" has potential for "appeal across genres." In 2017, Billboard contributor Chuck Dauphin placed seven tracks from the album on his top 10 list of Ballerini's best songs: "Love Me Like You Mean It" at number one, "Peter Pan" at number two, "Looking at Stars" at number five, "Yeah Boy" at number seven, "Dibs" at number eight, the title track at number nine and "Square Pegs" at number ten.

The First Time debuted at number 31 on the Billboard 200 and number four on the Top Country Albums chart with first week sales of 13,500 copies. On the Billboard 200, it left the top 100 the week of August 1, 2015, spending 100 weeks on the chart. The album was certified platinum by the Recording Industry Association of America (RIAA) on December 10, 2020. It has sold 306,700 copies in the US as of October 2017.

Track listing

Personnel 
 Adam Ayan – mastering
 Kelsea Ballerini – lead vocals, background vocals
 Kenneth Coca – cello on "The First Time" and "Secondhand Smoke"
 Jennifer Denmark – background vocals on "Sirens"
 Shannon Forrest – drums on "The First Time"
 Shani Gandhi – mixing
 Adam Haynes – fiddle on "Sirens"
 Josh Kerr – swell guitar and background vocals on "Underage"
 Jesse Lee – background vocals on "Peter Pan"
 Jason Massey – banjo, bass guitar, drums, acoustic guitar, electric guitar, mandolin, organ, percussion, piano, producer, programming, slide guitar, tracking, background vocals
 Jonathan Roye – mixing
 Kevin Savigar – piano on "Stilettos" 
 F. Reid Shippen – mixing
 Forest Glen Whitehead – banjo, bass guitar, acoustic guitar, electric guitar, mandolin, piano, producer, programming, slide guitar, background vocals

Charts

Weekly charts

Year end charts

Certifications

References 

2015 debut albums
Kelsea Ballerini albums
Black River Entertainment albums